Camaron rebosado is a deep-fried battered shrimp dish in Philippine cuisine. It is usually served with a sweet and sour sauce. It is a common dish in Philippine cuisine.

Etymology
The term camaron rebosado comes from Spanish camarón ("shrimp"); and rebosar (originally "bubble over, overflow", but meaning "battered" in Tagalog). Despite the Spanish name, the dish is Chinese Filipino, originally introduced by Chinese migrants to the Philippines.

Preparation

Camaron rebosado is prepared by removing the heads, and sometimes the tails as well, of the shrimp. It is then sliced lengthwise along the back and butterflied, with the vein removed. The shrimp is then marinated for a few minutes in a mixture of calamansi juice, salt, black pepper, garlic, and other spices to taste. The batter is made by mixing flour with egg, black pepper, corn starch or baking powder, and water. The shrimp is coated evenly and then fried in hot oil. It is also common to coat the shrimp in bread crumbs before frying.

Camaron rebosado is traditionally served with sweet and sour sauce (agre dulce). The sauce may be poured atop the cooked shrimp or served as a dipping sauce. It can also be served with soy sauce and calamansi juice (toyomansi), garlic-infused mayonnaise, or tomato and banana ketchup.

Camaron rebosado is similar to Japanese tempura, although tempura uses a lighter batter that is chilled before frying.

Variations
Camaron rebosado con jamon (also spelled camaron rebosado con hamon) is a variation of the dish that includes ham wrapped around the shrimp in its preparation. It is a traditional dish in the Binondo district of Manila, the city's Chinatown.

See also

 Calamares
 Fried prawn
 Okoy
 Pancit choca
 List of deep fried foods
 List of Philippine dishes
 List of seafood dishes
 List of shrimp dishes

References

External links
 

Deep fried foods
Philippine cuisine
Shrimp dishes